Adam Gotsis (born 23 September 1992) is an Australian professional American football defensive end for the Jacksonville Jaguars of the National Football League (NFL). He played college football at Georgia Tech and was drafted by the Denver Broncos in the second round of the 2016 NFL Draft.

Early life
Gotsis was born in Melbourne, Australia to parents of Greek heritage, he was raised in the suburb of Abbotsford. He grew up playing Australian rules football and supported the North Melbourne Football Club in the Australian Football League. At the age of 13, while attending Kew High School, his interest in Australian rules football had waned and his mother discovered a local junior American football club via a Google search, the Monash Warriors, that Gotsis and his older brother would later join. He recorded a team-high 12.5 sacks and earned league MVP honors in 2010. He progressed through the local ranks and eventually represented the Australian national American football team at the IFAF World Championship in December 2011. A month later, Gotsis signed to play college football for Georgia Tech and arrived in Atlanta in July 2012.

College career
Gotsis spent four years playing college football for the Georgia Tech Yellow Jackets football team. Gotsis appeared in 48 games (37 starts) at Georgia Tech, totaling 110 tackles (69 solo), 12.5 sacks, two interceptions, two fumble recoveries and four blocked kicks. He started the first nine games of his senior season, finishing the year with 31 tackles (20 solo), five tackles for loss, a team-best three sacks and two fumble recoveries before a season-ending knee injury. Gotsis started all 14 games along the defensive line his junior season, posting 36 tackles (23 solo), three sacks, one interception, three passes defensed and two blocked kicks. He was named to the All-ACC Second-team by both the media and coaches. Gotsis started all 13 games of his sophomore season at nose tackle, recording 38 tackles (23 solo), 5.5 sacks, one interception and one pass defensed in addition to blocking two kicks. He ranked second on team in tackles for loss (14.5) and sacks (5.5). He graduated from Georgia Tech with a degree in Business Administration in December 2015.

Professional career

Denver Broncos
Gotsis was drafted by the Denver Broncos in the second round (63rd overall) in the 2016 NFL Draft. He became the highest-drafted Australian-born player in NFL history. On 26 May 2016, the Broncos announced that they had signed Gotsis to a four-year, $5.40 million contract with a signing bonus of $1.06 million.

Gotsis played all 16 games and finished with 14 tackles (5 solo), one pass defensed and one fumble recovery. Gotsis made his NFL debut vs. the Carolina Panthers on 8 September 2016.

In 2017, Gotsis started 13-of-16 games played, totaling 41 tackles (28 solo), two sacks, four passes defensed and one fumble recovery. He earned his first NFL start and made four tackles (2 solo) vs. the Dallas Cowboys on 17 September 2017. Gotsis recorded his first career sack and blocked a field goal vs. the New York Giants on 15 October 2017.

On December 23, 2019, Gotsis was placed on injured reserve after undergoing knee surgery.

Jacksonville Jaguars
On August 2, 2020, Gotsis signed with the Jacksonville Jaguars.

Gotsis re-signed with the Jaguars on March 25, 2021. He played in 16 games with four starts, recording three sacks and 27 tackles.

On May 4, 2022, Gotsis re-signed with the Jaguars.

Controversy 
In March 2018, Gotsis was arrested for alleged rape of a woman in 2013, while he was a student-athlete at Georgia Tech. He surrendered himself to Atlanta Police on 7 March 2018, and was released after posting $US 50,000. On 15 August 2018, the Fulton County District Attorney’s Office announced that it would not pursue charges against Gotsis.

References

External links
 Georgia Tech Yellow Jackets bio
 Denver Broncos bio
 

1992 births
Living people
American football defensive ends
American football defensive tackles
Australian people of Greek descent
Australian players of American football
Denver Broncos players
Georgia Tech Yellow Jackets football players
Jacksonville Jaguars players
Sportspeople from Melbourne
People from Abbotsford, Victoria